α-Hydroxy acids, or alpha hydroxy acids (AHAs), are a class of chemical compounds that consist of a carboxylic acid with a hydroxyl group substituent on the adjacent (alpha) carbon. Prominent examples are glycolic acid, lactic acid, mandelic acid and citric acid.

Although these compounds are related to the ordinary carboxylic acids and are therefore weak acids, their chemical structure allows for the formation of an internal hydrogen bond between the hydrogen at the hydroxyl group and one of the oxygen atoms of the carboxylic group. The net effect is an increase in acidity. For example, the pKa of lactic acid is 3.86, while that of the unsubstituted propionic acid is 4.87; a full pKa unit difference means that lactic acid is ten times stronger than propionic acid.

Industrial applications

Feed additives
2-Hydroxy-4-(methylthio)butyric acid is produced commercially as a racemic mixture to substitute for methionine in animal feed. In nature, the same compound is an intermediate in the biosynthesis of 3-dimethylsulfoniopropionate, precursor to natural dimethyl sulfide.

Lactide-based polymers

Synthesis and reactions
α-Hydroxy acids are classically prepared by addition of hydrogen cyanide to a ketone or aldehyde, followed by acidic hydrolysis of the resulting cyanohydrin product.

Dilithiated carboxylic acids react with oxygen to give α-hydroxy acids after an aqueous workup:
RCHLiCO2Li + O2 → RCH(O2Li)CO2Li
RCH(O2Li)CO2Li +   H+ → RCH(OH)CO2H + 2Li+ + ...

α-Keto aldehydes undergo the Cannizaro reaction to give α-hydroxy acids:
RC(O)CHO + 2OH− → RCH(OH)CO2− + H2O

α-Hydroxy acids are useful building blocks in organic synthesis. For example, they are precursors in the preparation aldehydes via oxidative bond cleavage. Compounds of this class are used on the industrial-scale and include glycolic acid, lactic acid, citric acid, and mandelic acid. They are susceptible to acid-catalyzed decarbonylation to give, in addition to carbon monoxide, a ketone/aldehyde and water.

α-Hydroxy acids can form polyesters and membraneless protocellular structures.

Safety 
AHAs are generally safe when used on the skin as a cosmetic agent using the recommended dosage. The most common side-effects are mild skin irritations, redness and flaking. The severity usually depends on the pH and the concentration of the acid used. Chemical peels tend to have more severe side-effects including blistering, burning and skin discoloration, although they are usually mild and go away a day or two after treatment.

The United States Food and Drug Administration has also warned consumers that care should be taken when using AHAs after an industry-sponsored study found that they can increase photosensitivity to the sun. Other sources suggest that glycolic acid, in particular, may have a photoprotective effect.

See also 
 Beta hydroxy acid
 Hydroxybutyric acid
 Omega hydroxy acid

Further reading

References

External links 
 U.S. Food and Drug Administration: Alpha Hydroxy Acids in Cosmetics
 The Ordinary Application of AHA technology in cosmetic production

 
Cosmetics chemicals